The David Sears House is a historic house located along Beacon Street in the Beacon Hill neighborhood of Boston, Massachusetts. The three story house was built in several stages between 1816 and 1875. Now a National Historic Landmark, it was one of the first houses built of granite in the city, and was designed by Alexander Parris for David Sears, a prominent merchant, philanthropist, and landowner. The carved granite panels that adorn the facade were carved by Solomon Willard.

The original 1816 house was a two-story L-shaped structure with a hip roof, with a facade that was seven bays wide. In c. 1824 Sears had the building nearly doubled in size, adding three bays to the facade, and moving the front door to its present location. In 1875, after the building was acquired by the Somerset Club, the third floor was added, changing the roof from a hip to a gable. This work also included renovations to the interior of the first two floors. The building was again enlarged to the rear in 1900, adding additional space for servants.

The house is still owned by Somerset Club, and is not open to the general public. It was designated a National Historic Landmark and listed on the National Register of Historic Places in 1970.

See also
 List of National Historic Landmarks in Boston
 National Register of Historic Places listings in northern Boston, Massachusetts

References

External links

 Boston History & Architecture: David Sears House / Somerset Club
 The Massachusetts Cultural Resource Information System 

Houses completed in 1816
Houses in Boston
National Historic Landmarks in Boston
Beacon Hill, Boston
Federal architecture in Massachusetts
1816 establishments in Massachusetts
Historic district contributing properties in Massachusetts
Houses on the National Register of Historic Places in Suffolk County, Massachusetts
National Register of Historic Places in Boston